Science in Action was a weekly half-hour television program devoted to science. The program was produced by the California Academy of Sciences, and was broadcast from 1950-1966. It was thus among the first live science television program in the United States; The Johns Hopkins Science Review was broadcast from 1948–1955, and is apparently the very first such program. In all, 566 programs were produced. Dr. Tom Groody hosted the program for its first two years; he was succeeded by Dr. Earl S. Herald, who was the host for the following fourteen years until production ceased in 1966. 

Marcel LaFollette has written, "Production approaches that are now standard practice on NOVA and the Discovery Channel derive, in fact, from experimentation by television pioneers like Lynn Poole and Don Herbert and such programs as Adventure, Zoo Parade, Science in Action, and the Bell Telephone System’s science specials. These early efforts were also influenced by television’s love of the dramatic, refined during its first decade and continuing to shape news and public affairs programming, as well as fiction and fantasy, today." LaFollette included the program in her 2008 overview of early broadcasting devoted to science popularization.

References

External links
Science in Action film clips at Internet Archive

Science education television series
American educational television series
1950 American television series debuts
1966 American television series endings
1950s American television series
1960s American television series
Documentary films about science
California Academy of Sciences
Science and technology in the San Francisco Bay Area
Science and technology in the United States